Ken Harada may refer to:

Ken Harada (diplomat) (died 1973), former special envoy from Japan to the Holy See
Ken Harada (politician) (1919–1997), former member of the Diet of Japan